Joel Gallen (born 1957) is an American television and film director and producer.  He is the founder and president of Tenth Planet Productions.

Early life and education
Gallen was born and raised in Detroit, Michigan.  He attended the University of Rhode Island and graduated with a BS in 1979.

Career
Gallen has produced and directed many live television events and has won numerous awards, including an Emmy, Peabody, PGA and DGA award for producing and directing America: A Tribute to Heroes immediately following the 9/11 attacks. He has executive produced and directed the last fourteen Comedy Central Roasts, including Justin Bieber, Bruce Willis, and Pam Anderson.  Gallen has directed and produced 19 Rock and Roll Hall of Fame induction ceremonies between 1993 and 2021, and executive produced and directed the multiple Emmy winning 25th Anniversary Rock and Roll Hall of Fame Concert at Madison Square Garden in 2009. From 2007 through 2010, Gallen was the executive producer and director of CNN Heroes. Gallen executive produced and directed the Stand Up to Cancer live multi-network broadcasts in 2012 and 2014. The 2014 broadcast raised more than 100 million dollars for new clinical trials. He also produced and directed The Concert for Valor for HBO in November 2014 held on the Mall in Washington, D.C. In March 2022, Gallen will executive produce and direct the Independent Spirit Awards for the eighth consecutive year. Gallen produced and directed Chris Rock’s HBO Special Never Scared and also produced and directed both HBO Specials for Ellen DeGeneres in the early 2000s. He more recently executive produced and directed Ellen's first stand-up special in 15 years—Relatable—which premiered on Netflix in December 2018.

In January 2019 Gallen produced "I Am the Highway:  A Tribute to Chris Cornell", a 5-hour concert event hosted by Jimmy Kimmel with special guests including Foo Fighters, Metallica, Miley Cyrus, Brandi Carlile, Brad Pitt, Chris Stapleton, Jack Black, Miguel, Taylor Momsen, Josh Brolin, Perry Farrell, Audioslave, Temple of the Dog and Soundgarden.

Gallen was the executive producer of two prime-time reality-competition series: The Sing-Off, an a cappella competition series for NBC for 3 seasons (2009–11); and America's Best Dance Crew, a dance competition series for MTV for 7 seasons (2008-2012). More recently, Gallen executive produced and directed 8 episodes of The Comedy Jam for Comedy Central (2017), and also 14 episodes of Roast Battle (2016–18).

Gallen was an executive at MTV in the early 1990s where he created and produced a number of popular shows and specials including the MTV Movie Awards. He went on to produce 14 of the first 15 MTV Movie Awards shows between 1992 and 2006. Gallen returned to helm the MTV Movie and TV Awards in 2018 and 2019 and the show's ratings were the highest in years. Gallen conceived and directed many of the Movie Award short comedic films that featured Ben Stiller, Tom Cruise, Jack Black, Will Ferrell, Justin Timberlake, Jimmy Fallon and Tiffany Haddish.

Gallen produced a short film for Zoolander while producing the VH-1 Fashion Awards in the late 1990s and executive produced the movie for Paramount in 2001. He directed the hit comedy Not Another Teen Movie for Sony Pictures that same year.

Gallen lives in Los Angeles.

Selected filmography

References

External links 

Tenth Planet Productions

Living people
1957 births
American television producers
American film directors